Erigeron porphyrolepis is a Chinese species of flowering plants in the family Asteraceae. It grows on slopes and meadows in Sichuan and Tibet.

Erigeron porphyrolepis is a perennial, clumping-forming herb up to 27 cm (11 inches) tall, forming a thick woody rhizomes. Its flower heads have purple ray florets surrounding yellow disc florets.

References

porphyrolepis
Flora of China
Plants described in 1842